Sar Kul or Sarkul may refer to:
 Sarkul, Khuzestan